Beyond the Spectrum is a science fiction novel by Martin Thomas, published in 1964.

Beyond the Spectrum is set in the 30th century.  It concerns an invasion of Earth by the inhabitants of the invisible planet Nihil.  Earth attempts to stop the invasion using a team of psychics. It begins with a young couple Addis and Bia who are enjoying themselves, then suddenly Addis gets knocked out by a stun ray gun and gets taken away into an invisible craft. The humans must utilize their psychics to find the enemy and gather more intelligence on them.

External links 

1964 British novels
1964 science fiction novels
Fiction set in the 30th century